Non Sa-at railway station is a railway station located in Non Sa-at Subdistrict, Non Sa-at District, Udon Thani Province.

References 

Railway stations in Thailand
Udon Thani province